The Santa Fe art colony was an art colony in Santa Fe, New Mexico, United States, which developed in the early 1900s.

The active time frame of the colony was between about 1910 and the second World War.

The Camino del Monte Sol Historic District, including a large portion of the art colony, was listed on the National Register of Historic Places in 1988.

In 2019, there remains a considerable number of art museums and art galleries in and around the city.

See also
Taos art colony

References

Further reading
Literary Pilgrims: The Santa Fe and Taos Writers' Colonies, 1917-1950, by Lynn Cline, 2007, University of New Mexico Press

American artist groups and collectives
Artist colonies
Culture of Santa Fe, New Mexico
Progressive Era in the United States